Ataullah (born 2 February 1986) is a Pakistani first-class cricketer who plays for Rawalpindi.

References

External links
 

1986 births
Living people
Pakistani cricketers
Bahawalpur cricketers
National Bank of Pakistan cricketers
Rawalpindi cricketers
People from Rajanpur District
Southern Punjab (Pakistan) cricketers